Part of The American Film Institute (AFI 100 Years... series), AFI's 100 Years... 100 Movie Quotes is a list of the top 100 quotations in American cinema. The American Film Institute revealed the list on June 21, 2005, in a three-hour television program on CBS. The program was hosted by Pierce Brosnan and had commentary from many Hollywood actors and filmmakers. A jury consisting of 1,500 film artists, critics, and historians selected "Frankly, my dear, I don't give a damn", spoken by Clark Gable as Rhett Butler in the 1939 American Civil War epic Gone with the Wind, as the most memorable American movie quotation of all time.

Criteria
Jurors were asked to consider the following criteria in making their selections:
 Movie quotation: A statement, phrase or brief exchange of dialogue spoken in an American film. Lyrics from songs are not eligible.
 Cultural impact: Movie quotations that viewers use in their own lives and situations; circulating through popular culture, they become part of the national lexicon.
 Legacy: Movie quotations that viewers use to evoke the memory of a treasured film, thus ensuring and enlivening its historical legacy.

The list

The table below reproduces the quotes as the AFI published them.

By the numbers 
With six quotes, Casablanca is the most represented film. Gone with the Wind and The Wizard of Oz are tied for second, with three each. Sunset Boulevard, A Streetcar Named Desire, The Graduate, and Jerry Maguire each have two quotes.

Rick Blaine (Casablanca) is the character with the most quotes (four); Dorothy Gale (The Wizard of Oz), Harry Callahan (Dirty Harry and Sudden Impact), James Bond (Dr. No and Goldfinger), Norma Desmond (Sunset Boulevard), Scarlett O'Hara (Gone with the Wind), and The Terminator (The Terminator and Terminator 2: Judgment Day) have two quotes each.

With five, Humphrey Bogart is the actor with the most quotes (four from Casablanca and one from The Maltese Falcon). Al Pacino, Bette Davis, Marlon Brando, Tom Hanks, and Vivien Leigh have three apiece, while Jack Nicholson, Judy Garland, Gloria Swanson, Dustin Hoffman, Clint Eastwood, Charlton Heston, James Cagney, and Arnold Schwarzenegger have two each. Sean Connery also has two entries, but his two quotes are shared with five other actors. As well as the five quotes spoken by Bogart, two other quotes on the list (from The Treasure of the Sierra Madre and To Have and Have Not) were spoken to him, by Alfonso Bedoya and Lauren Bacall, respectively. Further, "Round up the usual suspects." was spoken in his presence and for his character's benefit by Claude Rains, and "Play it, Sam." is often mistakenly attributed to him; he actually said, "You played it for her, you can play it for me. ... If she can stand it, I can! Play it!"

The line "My precious", from The Lord of the Rings: The Two Towers, is the only quote from a movie released in the 21st century and the only one by a CGI character.

Quotations by decade:
1920s: 1
1930s: 16
1940s: 17
1950s: 9
1960s: 13
1970s: 16
1980s: 17
1990s: 10
2000s: 1

Top years:
1942: 9
1939: 7
1967: 5
1933: 4
1976: 4

Misquotes

A number of the entries are frequently misquoted. The following have become well-known but are incorrect:
 #4: "Toto, I don't think we're in Kansas anymore."
 #7: "I'm ready for my closeup, Mr. DeMille."
 #9: "Fasten your seatbelts. It's going to be a bumpy ride."
 #26: "Why don't you come up and see me sometime?"
 #28: "Play it again, Sam."
 #35: "We're gonna need a bigger boat."
 #36: "Badges? We don't need no stinkin' badges!"
 #39: "If you build it, they will come."
 #40: "Life is like a box of chocolates."
 #47: "Come back, Shane."
 #50: "Houston, we've got a problem."
 #51: "Do you feel lucky, punk?"
 #57: "Greed is good."
 #63: "Mrs. Robinson, are you trying to seduce me?"

Real-life sources
A number of the quotes are drawn from real-world events and sources:

Opening and closing lines
Only "Rosebud", from Citizen Kane, is the opening line of a film. Eleven other quotes are closing lines:

In addition, the line "There's no place like home." from The Wizard of Oz (1939 film) (#23) is spoken in the middle of the film and as the closing line.

See also
 Catchphrases
 List of catchphrases

References

External links
List of the 400 nominees (Archived)

AFI 100 Years... series
Lists of English phrases

Centennial anniversaries